Warroo is a rural locality in the Goondiwindi Region, Queensland, Australia. In the  Warroo had a population of 25 people.

History 
The locality was officially named and bounded on 17 December 1999.

In the  Warroo had a population of 25 people.

References 

Goondiwindi Region
Localities in Queensland